Suzhou (Suzhounese: sou¹ tseu¹ ,), alternately romanized as Soochow, is a major city in southern Jiangsu province, East China. Suzhou is the most populous city in Jiangsu, and a major economic center and focal point of trade and commerce.

Administratively, Suzhou is a prefecture-level city with a population of 6,715,559 in the city proper, and a total resident population of 12,748,262 as of the 2020 census in its administrative area. The city jurisdiction area's north waterfront is on a lower reach of the Yangtze whereas it has its more focal south-western waterfront on Lake Tai – crossed by several waterways, its district belongs to the Yangtze River Delta region. Suzhou is now part of the Greater Shanghai metro area, incorporating most of Changzhou, Wuxi and Suzhou urban districts plus Kunshan and Taicang, with a population of more than 38,000,000 residents as of 2020. Its urban population grew at an unprecedented rate of 6.5% between 2000 and 2014, which is the highest among cities with more than 5,000,000 people.

Founded in 514BC, Suzhou has had a long and productive history. Local museums host abundant displays of its relics and many sites of historical interest exist. Around AD100, during the Eastern Han dynasty, it became one of the ten largest cities in the world, mostly due to emigration from northern China. Since the 10th century, Suzhou has been an important center of China's industry and foreign trade. During the late 15th century to the 19th century, Suzhou was a national economic, cultural, and commercial center, as well as the largest non-capital city in the world, until it was overtaken by Shanghai. Since major economic reforms began in 1978, Suzhou has become one of the fastest growing major cities in the world, with GDP growth rates of about 14% in the past 35 years. With high life expectancy and per capita incomes, Suzhou's Human Development Index ratings is roughly comparable to a moderately developed country, making it one of the most highly developed and prosperous cities in China.

Suzhou is also famous for its classical gardens, date back to the 6th century BC, when the city was founded as the capital of the state of Wu. Inspired by these royal hunting gardens built by the King of Wu, private gardens began emerging around the 4th century and finally reached the climax in the 18th century.

Suzhou is also one of the top 50 major cities in the world by scientific research outputs as tracked by the Nature Index, and home to multiple major universities in China, including Soochow University, Suzhou University of Science and Technology, Xi'an Jiaotong-Liverpool University and Changshu Institute of Technology.

The city's canals, stone bridges, pagodas, and meticulously designed gardens have contributed to its status as one of the top tourist attractions and liveable cities in China. The Classical Gardens of Suzhou were added to the list of the UNESCO World Heritage Sites in 1997 and 2000. Suzhou is often dubbed the "Venice of the East" or "Venice of China".

Names
During the Zhou dynasty, a settlement known as Gusu after nearby Mount Gusu became the capital of the state of Wu. From this role, it also came to be called Wu as well. In 514BC, King Helü of Wu established a new capital nearby at Helü City and this grew into the modern city. During the Warring States period, Helü City continued to serve as the local seat of government. From the areas it administered, it became known as Wuxian (. "Wu County") and Wujun ("Wu Commandery"). Under the Qin, it was known as Kuaiji after its greatly enlarged commandery, which was named for the reputed resting place of Yu the Great near modern Shaoxing in Zhejiang.

The name "Suzhou" was first officially used for the city in AD 589 during the Sui dynasty. Su ( or ) in its name is a contraction of the old name Gusu. It refers to the mint perilla (shiso). The zhou  originally meant something like a province or county (cf. Guizhou), but often came to be used metonymously for the capital of such a region (cf. Guangzhou, Hangzhou, etc.). Suzhou is the Hanyu Pinyin spelling of the Putonghua pronunciation of the name. Prior to the adoption of pinyin, it was variously romanized as Soo-chow, Suchow, or Su-chow.

History
Suzhou, the cradle of Wu culture, is one of the oldest towns in the Yangtze Basin. By the Spring and Autumn period of the Zhou, local Baiyue tribes named the Gou Wu are recorded living in the area which would become the modern city of Suzhou. These tribes formed villages on the edges of the hills above the wetlands surrounding Lake Tai.

Sima Qian's Records of the Grand Historian records traditional accounts that the Zhou lord Taibo established the state of Wu at nearby Wuxi during the 11th centuryBC, civilizing the local people and improving their agriculture and mastery of irrigation. The Wu court later moved to Gusu within the area of modern Suzhou. In 514BC, King Helü of Wu relocated his court nearby and called the settlement Helü City after himself. His minister Wu Zixu was closely involved with its planning and it was this site that grew into present-day Suzhou. The height of his tower on Gusu Hill (Gusutai) passed into Chinese legend. In 496BC, King Helü was buried at Tiger Hill. In 473BC, Wu was defeated and annexed by Yue, a kingdom to its southeast; Yue was annexed in turn by Chu in 306BC. Remnants of the ancient kingdom include pieces of its 2,500-year-old city wall and the gate through it at Pan Gate.

The city was originally laid out according to a symbolic three-by-three grid of nine squares, with the royal palace occupying the central position.

During the Warring States period, Suzhou was the seat of Wu County (Wú xiàn) and Commandery (Wú jùn). Following the Qin Empire's conquest of the area in 222BC, it was made the capital of Kuaiji Commandery, including lands stretching from the south bank of the Yangtze to the unconquered interior of Minyue in southern Zhejiang. Amid the collapse of the Qin, Kuaiji's governor Yin Tong attempted to organize his own rebellion only to be betrayed and executed by Xiang Liang and his nephew Xiang Yu, who launched their own rebellion from the city.

When the Grand Canal was completed, Suzhou found itself strategically located on a major trade route. Suzhou served as the regional metropolis of industry and foreign commerce on the southeastern coast of China. During the Tang dynasty, the great poet Bai Juyi constructed the Shantang Canal (better known as "Shantang Street") to connect the city with Tiger Hill for tourists. In AD1035, the Suzhou Confucian Temple was founded by famed poet and writer Fan Zhongyan. It became a venue for the imperial civil examinations and then developed into the modern Suzhou High School in the 1910s.

After February 1130, riots and unrest disrupted Suzhou. In 1356, Suzhou became the capital of Zhang Shicheng, King of Wu. In 1367, Zhang's rival Zhu Yuanzhang took the city after a 10-month siege. Zhu  who was soon to proclaim himself the first emperor of the Ming dynasty  demolished the old city walls at the center of Suzhou's walled city and imposed crushing taxes on the city and prefecture's powerful families. Despite the heavy taxation and the forced exile of some prominent citizens' south, Suzhou was soon prosperous again. During the early Ming, Suzhou Prefecture supervised the Yangtze shoals which later became Shanghai's Chongming Island. For centuries the city, with its surroundings as an economic base, represented an extraordinary source of tax revenue.

When the shipwrecked Korean official Choe Bu had a chance to see much of Eastern China from Zhejiang to Liaoning on his way home in 1488, he described Suzhou in his travel report as exceeding every other city. Under the Ming, Suzhou was a prosperous center of the Nanzhili area controlled by the secondary capital at Nanjing; scholar-officials constructed the area's most famous private gardens during this period in a "Jiangnan style" copied at the time by Shanghai's Yu Garden and later by parts of the empress dowager Cixi's Summer Palace.

After the Qing occupied the area in 1644 and 1645, it was reorganized as Jiangnan Province, whose "Right" Governor controlled its eastern prefectures from Suzhou until the division of Jiangnan into the separate provinces of Jiangsu and Anhui at some point during the reign of the Qianlong Emperor. The Taipings captured the city in 1860. Many of its former buildings and gardens were "almost... a heap of ruins" by the time of their recovery by Charles Gordon's Ever-Victorious Army in November 1863. Nonetheless, by 1880, its population was estimated to have recovered to about 500,000, which remained stable for the next few decades. In the late 19th century, the town was particularly known for its wide range of silks and its Chinese-language publishing industry. The town was first opened to direct foreign trades by the Treaty of Shimonoseki ending the First Sino-Japanese War and by the most favored nation clauses of earlier unequal treaties with the Great Powers. The new expatriates opened a European-and-Chinese school in 1900 and the Suzhou railway station, connecting it with Shanghai, opened on 16 July 1906. Just prior to the World War I, there were 7000 silk looms in operation, as well as a cotton mill and a large trade in rice.

As late as the early 20th century, much of the city consisted of islands connected by rivers, creeks, and canals to the surrounding countryside. The Japanese invaded in 1937, and many gardens were again devastated by the end of the war. In the early 1950s, restoration was done on the Humble Administrator's Garden and the Lingering Garden.

Administrative divisions

The urban core of Suzhou is informally called the "Old Town." It is Gusu District. Suzhou Industrial Park is to the east of the old town, and Suzhou High & New Technology Development Zone is to the west. In 2000, the original Wu County was divided into two districts including Xiangcheng and Wuzhong. They now form the northern and southern parts of the city of Suzhou. In 2012, the original Wujiang City became Wujiang District of Suzhou City.

Suzhou is one of the most prosperous cities in China. Its development has a direct correlation with the growth of its satellite cities, including Kunshan, Taicang, Changshu, and Zhangjiagang, which together with the city of Suzhou form the Suzhou prefecture. The Suzhou prefecture is home to many high-tech enterprises.

Geography

Climate
Suzhou has a four-season humid subtropical climate with hot, humid summers and cool, cloudy, damp winters with occasional snowfall (Köppen climate classification Cfa). Northwesterly winds blowing from Siberia during winter can cause temperatures to fall below freezing at night, while southerly or southwesterly winds during the summer can push temperatures above .

Cityscape and environment

Classical Gardens of Suzhou

Suzhou is famous for its over 60 Classical Gardens, collectively a UNESCO World Heritage Site. The city has the most UNESCO-recognized gardens in the world.
 
The Humble Administrator's Garden and Lingering Garden are among the four most famous classical gardens in China. The Canglang Pavilion, Lion Grove Garden, Humble Administrator's Garden and Lingering Garden, respectively representing the garden styles of traditional architecture are called the four most famous gardens in Suzhou. Other gardens inscribed on the World Heritage List include the Couple's Retreat Garden, the Garden of Cultivation, and the Retreat and Reflection Garden. Five Peaks Garden which dates to the Ming dynasty (1522-1566) is also located in the Suzhou. Ming painter Wen Boren established his home on the site. The original name was Qiayin Shanfang and the garden is located at Changmin West Street.

Temples
Hanshan Temple
Xiyuan Temple
Xuanmiao Temple
Lingyanshan Temple
Chongyuan Temple

Canals and Historic Districts 

The Suzhou section of the Jiangnan Canal, Grand Canal (China), includes ten city gates and over 20 stone bridges of traditional design and historic areas that have been well preserved, as well as temples and pavilions. 

 There are a full 24 waterways in Suzhou near the Grand Canal.

In 2015, both 800-year-old Pingjiang Road Historical Block and 1,200-year-old Shantang Street Scenic Area were added to the list of China's "National Historic and Cultural Streets".

Pingjiang Road runs parallel to the Pingjiang River for 1.5 kilometers and is lined with homes and some teahouses. Shantang Street, over twice as long at 3.8 km, is described by the BBC as retaining "the alluring qualities of an old canal-side street: whitewashed buildings are completed by red-tasseled lanterns that swing softly in the breeze, adding to the charm of the river bank".

Boat tours are offered on the waterways of this city that was dubbed the "Venice of the East" by Marco Polo because of its criss-crossing canals and stone bridges. The Grand Canal (from Beijing to Zhejiang province) is a UNESCO World Heritage Site.

Resorts and natural reserves
Suzhou Taihu National Tourism and Vacation Zone is in the western part of Suzhou,  from the city center.

Skyscrapers

Gate to the East is a 301.8 meter, 74-story skyscraper in Suzhou's central business district, built in 2015 at a cost of 700 million USD and is currently the tallest building in Suzhou.

Pan Gate
Pan Gate is on the southwest corner of the Main Canal or encircling canal of Suzhou. Originally built during the Warring States Period in the state of Wu, historians estimate it to be around 2,500 years old. It is now part of the Pan Gate Scenic Area. It is known for the "three landmarks of Pan Gate". They are the Ruiguang Pagoda, the earliest pagoda in Suzhou built in 247BC, the Wu Gate Bridge, the entrance to the gate at that time over the water passage and the highest bridge in Suzhou at the time, and the Pan Gate. The Ruigang Pagoda is constructed of brick with wooden platforms and has Buddhist carvings at its base.

Baodai Bridge
Baodai Bridge stretches across the Tantai Lake in the suburbs of Suzhou. To raise money to finance the bridge, the magistrate donated his expensive belt, hence the name. The bridge was first built in 806 A.D. in the Tang dynasty and has 53 arches with a length of 317 meters. It was made out of stone from Jinshan Mountain and is the longest standing bridge of its kind in China. The bridge was included on the list of national monuments (resolution 5–285) in 2001.

Tiger Hill
Tiger Hill is known for its natural environment and historical sites. The hill is so named because it is said to look like a crouching tiger. Another legend states that a white tiger appeared on the hill to guard it following the burial The hill has been a tourist destination for hundreds, if not thousands, of years, as is evident from the poetry and calligraphy carved into rocks on the hill. The Song dynasty poet, Su Shi said, "It is a lifelong pity if having visited Suzhou you did not visit Tiger Hill."

Pagodas
Yunyan Pagoda (or Huqiu Tower), built in 961, is a Chinese pagoda built on Tiger Hill in Suzhou. It has several other names, including the "Leaning Tower of China" (as referred to by historian O.G. Ingles) and the Yunyan Temple Tower. The tower rises to a height of 47 m (154 ft). It is a seven-story octagonal building built with blue bricks. In more than a thousand years the tower has gradually slanted due to forces of nature. Now the top and bottom of the tower vary by 2.32 meters. However, the tower leans roughly 3 degrees due to the cracking of two supporting columns.

Beisi Pagoda or North Temple Pagoda is a Chinese pagoda at Bao'en Temple in Suzhou. It is the tallest Chinese pagoda south of the Yangtze river.

Twin Pagodas lie in the Dinghui Temple Lane in the southeastern corner of the city proper of Suzhou. They are artistic and natural as they are close at hand. One of them is called "Clarity-Dispensing Pagoda," and the other, the "Beneficence Pagoda"; they are in the same form of architecture. There are many legends about this one-thousand-year-old pagodas. It is charming that the exquisite and straight Twin Pagoda look like two inserted writing brushes. There was originally a single-story house with three rooms just like a writing brush holder with the shadows of the two pagodas reclining on its roof at sunset. To the east of the pagoda is a square five-story bell building built in the Ming dynasty which appears exactly like a thick ink stick. So there is a saying that "the Twin Pagodas are as writing brushes while the bell building as ink stick".

Museums

The city's major museums include the Suzhou Museum (designed by I. M. Pei), Suzhou Silk Museum, and the China Kunqu Museum.

Hospitals 
As a result of its recent rapid population increase, healthcare demand in Suzhou is increasing rapidly. In July 2019, Washington University School of Medicine announced a collaboration with Huici Health Management Co., and the Xiangcheng District, to open the new Huici Medical Center, which will include a 1,000-bed hospital for adult and pediatric patients. Once the hospital is unveiled, Washington University doctors in St. Louis will be able to provide long-distance health-care services to patients in China through a telemedicine program.

Demographics

The population of Suzhou is predominantly Han Chinese. The official language of broadcast, instruction, etc. is Mandarin Chinese, although many speak a local dialect known as Suzhounese, a member of the Wu language family. In addition to American and European expatriates, there is a large Korean community in Suzhou. The Industrial Bank of Korea (IBK) estimated that there were 15,000 Koreans in the municipality in 2014. That year 850 Korean companies operated in Suzhou, and the Koreans made up the largest number of students at the Suzhou Singapore International School.

Economy
Suzhou's economy is based primarily on its large manufacturing sector—China's first largest(from 2020)—including iron and steel, IT and electronic equipment, and textile products. The city's service sector is notably well-developed, primarily owing to tourism, which brought in a total of RMB 152 billion of revenue in 2013. Suzhou's overall GDP exceeded RMB 1.3 trillion in 2013 (up 9.6 percent from the year previous).

The city is also one of China's foremost destinations for foreign investment, based on its relative proximity to Shanghai and comparatively low operating costs. The municipal government has enacted various measures to encourage FDI in a number of manufacturing (e.g. pharmaceutical, electronic goods, automobile) and service (e.g. banking, logistics, research services) sectors. Included among these measures is a preferential tax policy for limited partnership venture capital enterprises in the Suzhou Industrial Park.

Suzhou is a highly developed economic region in China and is the economic centre, industrial, commercial and logistical hub city of Jiangsu province, as well as an important financial, cultural, artistic, educational and transportation centre.

Agriculture

In 2013, total grain production reached 1,311,200 tonnes, a decrease of 2.9%. Grain supply was effectively guaranteed through the vigorous construction of commodity grain production bases, wholesale grain markets and reserve systems.

Traditional handicrafts

Suzhou has a long history of reeling silkworms and has always been an important base for silk production in China. Since the Song and Yuan dynasties, Suzhou has been one of the centres of silk weaving and dyeing in the country, and in the Ming dynasty, Suzhou silk was praised as the "clothing of the world".

Development zones

Suzhou Industrial Park

The Suzhou Industrial Park (SIP) is the largest cooperative project between the Chinese and the Singaporean government. It is beside Jinji Lake, which lies to the east of the Suzhou Old City. On 26 February 1994, Vice Premier Li Lanqing and Senior Minister Lee Kuan Yew represented China and Singapore respectively in signing the Agreement to jointly develop Suzhou Industrial Park (originally called the Singapore Industrial Park). The project officially commenced on 12 May in the same year.

SIP is home to the Suzhou Dushu Lake Science and Education Innovation District, an area of universities and higher education institutions, including Soochow University and Xi'an Jiaotong-Liverpool University. Suzhou Industrial Park is also a popular residential district for many foreigners who work and live in Suzhou, as well as 'new Suzhou' residents who migrated to the area in search of work opportunities.

Suzhou Industrial Park Export Processing Zone
It is in Suzhou Industrial Park set up by China and Singapore. Inside the Export Processing Zone, all the infrastructures are of high standard.

Suzhou New District

The Suzhou New District was established in 1990. In November 1992, the zone was approved to be the national-level hi-tech industrial zone. By the end of 2007, foreign-invested companies had a registered capital worth of US$13 billion, of which US$6.8 billion was paid in. SND hosts now more than 1,500 foreign companies. Some 40 Fortune 500 companies set up 67 projects in the district.

Sports
Suzhou Dongwu currently play in China League One, the second highest level of Chinese professional football competition. The 13,000 seat Suzhou Industrial Park Sports Arena was one of the venues for the 2019 FIBA Basketball World Cup.

Transportation

Railway
Suzhou is on the Shanghai-Nanjing corridor which carries three parallel railways. Suzhou railway station, near the city center, is among the busiest passenger stations in China. It is served by the Beijing–Shanghai railway (mostly "conventional" trains to stations throughout China) and the Shanghai-Nanjing intercity railway (high-speed D- and G-series trains providing frequent service primarily between Shanghai and Nanjing). It takes only 25 minutes to reach Shanghai railway station on the fastest G-series trains and less than 1 hour to Nanjing.

The Suzhou North railway station, a few kilometers to the north, is on the Beijing–Shanghai high-speed railway (opened 2011), served by high-speed trains to Beijing, Qingdao, etc.

Other stations on the Beijing–Shanghai railway and the Shanghai–Nanjing intercity railway serve other points in the same corridor within Suzhou Prefecture-level city, such as Kunshan. In between Suzhou and Kunshan South railway station, Suzhou Industrial Park railway station is also an important station for people visiting and living in the areas.

The northern part of the prefectural area, including Zhangjiagang, Changshu and Taicang, were the last areas to be connected by rail; the Shanghai–Suzhou–Nantong railway reached there in 2020.

Highways
The Nanjing-Shanghai Expressway connects Suzhou with Shanghai, alternatively, there is the Yangtze Riverine Expressway and the Suzhou-Jiaxing-Hangzhou Expressway. In 2005, the Suzhou Outer Ring was completed, linking the peripheral county-level cities of Taicang, Kunshan, and Changshu. China National Highway 312 also passes through Suzhou.

Air transport
Suzhou is served by three airports, Sunan Shuofang International Airport (co-owned by Wuxi and Suzhou), Shanghai Hongqiao International Airport (one hour drive), and Shanghai Pudong International Airport (two hours drive).

Water transport

Port of Suzhou, on the right bank of the Yangtze River, dealt with 428 million tons of cargo and 5.86 million TEU containers in 2012, which made it the busiest inland river port in the world by annual cargo tonnage and container volume.

Metro

The Suzhou Rail Transit currently has five lines in operation and five other lines under construction. The masterplan consists of nine independent lines. Line 1 started operation on 28 April 2012, Line 2 started operation on 28 December 2013, and Line 4 started operation in 2017, Suzhou Railway Line 5 starts operation from June 2021. Line 6, Line 7 and Line 8 and Line S1 are under construction at the same time.

Tram

The Suzhou Tram system has two routes in the Suzhou New District.

Bus
Suzhou has public bus routes that run into all parts of the city. Fares are flat rated, usually 1 Yuan for a non-air-conditioned bus and 2 Yuan for an air-conditioned one. The Suzhou BRT, a -long bus rapid transit system opened in 2008, operates 5 lines using elevated busways and bus-only lanes throughout the city.

Culture

Opera: Kunqu originated in the Suzhou region, as does the much later Suzhou Opera. Ballad-singing, or Suzhou pingtan, is a local form of storytelling that mixes singing (accompanied by the pipa and sanxian) with portions in spoken dialect.
Silk: throughout China's Imperial past, Suzhou silk has been associated with high-quality silk products, supplying silks to ancient royal families. By the 13th century, Suzhou was already the center of the profitable silk trade.
Song brocade: Suzhou's Song brocade, with its flashy colors, exquisite patterns, strong and soft texture, is one of China's three famous brocades, together with Nanjing Yun brocade and Sichuan Shu brocade. Suzhou's brocade production can be traced back to the Five Dynasties. It prospered in the Song dynasty. After the government moved the capital southward, the country's political and cultural center moved to the Yangtze River area. To cope with the special need of artists, a type of very thin brocade for decorating paintings emerged in Suzhou. These brocades and paintings have been preserved. Whenever people talked about brocade, they mentioned the Song dynasty, and thus Song brocade got its name and has been well-known ever since.
Cuisine: Suzhou Cuisine (苏帮菜), which is part of the Jiangsu cuisine, including Yangcheng Lake large crab, Squirrel fish, etc. 
Handicrafts: Suzhou embroidery, fans, Chinese musical instruments, scroll mounting, lanterns, mahogany furniture, jade carving, silk tapestry, traditional painting pigments of Jiangenxutang Studio, the New Year's wood-block prints of Taohuawu Studio.
Paintings
Calligraphic art
Suzhou Silk Hand Embroidery Art
Suzhou is the original place of "Jasmine", a song sung by Chinese singers or actresses thousands of times on the occasions of almost every important meetings or celebrations. Jasmine is the symbol of Suzhou as well as Tai Hu Lake.
Suzhou Gardens: Gardens in Suzhou have an ancient history. The first garden in Suzhou belonged to the emperor of Wu State in Spring and Autumn Period (600 BC). More than 200 gardens existed in Suzhou between the 16th and 18th centuries. Gardens in Suzhou were built according to the style of Chinese Paintings. Every view in a garden can be seen as a piece of Chinese Painting and the whole garden is a huge piece of Chinese Paintings. At present, the Humble Administrator's Garden, built in 16th, is the largest private garden in Suzhou. It belonged to by Wang Xianchen, an imperial censor. 
Suzhou embroidery together with embroidery of Hunan, Sichuan and Guangdong are called as the "Four Famous Embroideries". Suzhou tapestry method is done in fine silks and gold thread. Other art forms found in this area are sculpture, Song brocade, jade and rosewood carving.
The Suzhou Museum has a rich collection of relics from many eras. The collection includes revolutionary records, stele carving, folk customs, drama and verse, Suzhou embroidery, silk cloth, gardens, coins and Buddhist artifacts.
Wedding gowns

Notable people

Lu Xun (183–245) military general and politician of the state of Eastern Wu during the Three Kingdoms era, most famous for his defeat of Liu Bei in the Battle of Xiaoting.

Feng Menglong (1574-1645) famous vernacular writer and poet of the late Ming Dynasty.

Tang Yin (1470-1524) one of the most renowned painter in China history, calligrapher, and poet of the Ming Dynasty, better known by his courtesy name Tang Bohu

Wen Zhengming (1470-1559) Painter and poet of the Ming Dynasty, the founder of Wu School, one of Four Masters of the Ming Dynasty

Weng Tonghe (1830–1904) Chinese Confucian scholar and imperial tutor of the Tongzhi and Guangxu emperors in the late Qing dynasty, who is one of the most obdurate old guard defending the traditional Confucianism practices while being stubbornly against reform efforts to westernise the country.

I. M. Pei (1917-2019) One of the best architects in China history, being recognised as the 'last master of high modernist architecture', famous for his design of Louvre Pyramid, Hong Kong Bank of China tower, Singapore OCBC Centre, East Building of National Gallery of Art in Washington, D.C., Germany Historical Museum, etc.

Tsung-Dao Lee (1926-) Physicist, who won the Nobel Prize in Physics in 1957 at the age of 30, for his work on the violation of the parity law in weak interactions.

Education

High schools
Changshu High School
Dulwich College Suzhou
Dulwich International High School Suzhou
Kunshan Senior High School

Suzhou Experimental High School
Suzhou High School
Suzhou Singapore International School

Suzhou No.10 High School
Suzhou Wuxian High School
Taicang Senior High School
Zhenze Middle School

Universities and colleges
Changshu Institute of Technology
Duke Kunshan University
KEDGE Business School
Jiangnan Social University
Jiangsu University Zhangjiagang Campus
Renmin University of China Suzhou Campus
Skema Business School – Chinese campus of the French business school
Soochow University
Suzhou Polytechnic Institute of Agriculture
Suzhou University of Science and Technology
Xi'an Jiaotong-Liverpool University

Under construction
Nanjing University Suzhou Campus
Northwestern Polytechnical University Taicang Campus

Postgraduate institutions
Southeast University-Monash University Joint Graduate School
Suzhou Dushu Lake Higher Education Town (National University of Singapore and Fudan Joint Graduate School, Nanjing University Graduate School, etc.)

Others
Japanese School of Suzhou
Overseas Chinese Academy Chiway Suzhou

See also

List of twin towns and sister cities in China
Port of Suzhou

Citations

Works cited 
.
.

General references 
Economic profile for Suzhou at HKTDC

External links

Official Resource for English-speaking travelers
Official website for Suzhou's municipal government
Suzhou city guide with open directory (Jiangsu Network)

 
Cities in Jiangsu
Jiangnan
Populated places established in the 6th century BC
Port cities and towns in China
Prefecture-level divisions of Jiangsu
Yangtze River Delta